The 2023 New York City City Council elections will be held on November 7, 2023, with primaries occurring on June 27, 2023. Due to redistricting and the 2020 changes to the New York City Charter, Councilmembers elected during the 2021 and 2023 City Council elections will serve two-year terms, with full four-year terms resuming after the 2025 New York City Council elections.

Party nominees will be chosen using ranked-choice voting.

Manhattan

District 1

Democratic primary

Declared
Ursila Jung, member of the Community Education Council from the 3rd district
Susan Lee, author, non-profit executive, and candidate for this seat in 2021
Christopher Marte, incumbent Councilmember
Pooi Stewart, candidate for New York's 86th State Assembly district in 2022

Republican primary

Declared
Helen Qiu, nominee for New York's 65th State Assembly district in 2022

Endorsements

District 2

Democratic primary

Declared
Carlina Rivera, incumbent Councilmember
Allie Ryan, Neighborhood Party nominee for this seat in 2021

Endorsements

Republican primary

Declared
Juan Pagan, perennial candidate

Endorsements

District 3

Democratic primary

Declared
Erik Bottcher, incumbent Councilmember

District 4

Democratic primary

Declared
Keith Powers, incumbent Councilmember

Republican primary

Declared
Brian Robinson, credit counselor and Democratic candidate for New York's 10th congressional district in 2022

Endorsements

District 5

Democratic primary

Declared
Julie Menin, incumbent Councilmember

Republican primary

Declared
Elizabeth Golluscio

Endorsements

District 6

Democratic primary

Declared
Gale Brewer, incumbent Councilmember

Republican primary

Declared
Diane di Stasio

Endorsements

District 7

Democratic primary

Declared
Shaun Abreu, incumbent Councilmember
Emily Shen Yuexin Miller

Republican primary

Declared
Jamal Lightly
Davon Phillips

District 9

Democratic primary

Declared
Inez Dickens, New York State Assemblymember from the 70th district (2017–present) and former Majority Whip of the New York City Council (2006–2013) from the 9th district (2006–2016)
Kristin Richardson Jordan, incumbent Councilmember
Yusef Salaam, criminal justice advocate and member of the Exonerated Five
Al Taylor, New York State Assemblymember from the 71st district (2017–present)

Potential
Athena Moore, political aide and candidate for this seat in 2021

Withdrawn
Joshua Clennon, low income housing manager and candidate for this seat in 2021

Endorsements

Republican primary

Declared
Skiboky Stora

District 10

Democratic primary

Declared
Carmen De La Rosa, incumbent Councilmember

Endorsements

Manhattan/Bronx crossover

District 8

Democratic primary

Declared
Diana Ayala, incumbent Councilmember
Ildefonso Rivera

Bronx

District 11

Democratic primary

Declared
Eric Dinowitz, incumbent Councilmember

District 12

Democratic primary

Declared
Aisha Hernandez Ahmed, former Chief of Staff for former Councilmember Andy King
Pamela Hamilton-Johnson, perennial candidate
Kevin Riley, incumbent Councilmember

Filed paperwork
Andy King, former Councilmember from the 12th district (2012–2020)

District 13

Democratic primary

Declared
Irene Estrada, former member of Bronx Community Board 11 and candidate for this seat in 2021
Bernadette Ferrara, candidate for the 15th district in the 2021 special and regular elections
Marjorie Velázquez, incumbent Councilmember

Endorsements

Republican primary

Declared
George Havranek, Bronx Times-Reporter columnist
Kristy Marmorato, healthcare worker
Grace Marrero
Phyllis Nastasio, nominee for New York's 80th State Assembly district in 2022
Ariel Rivera-Diaz, nominee for New York's 87th State Assembly district in 2022, nominee for the 15th district in 2021, and nominee for New York's 86th State Assembly district in 2018
Hasmine S. Zerka, nominee for New York's 34th State Senate district in 2022

Endorsements

District 14

Democratic primary

Declared
Rachel Bradshaw, President of the Northwest Bronx Democrats for Change
Pierina Sanchez, incumbent Councilmember

Endorsements

District 15

Democratic primary

Declared
Oswald Feliz, incumbent Councilmember

District 16

Democratic primary

Declared
Cynthia Cox, candidate for New York's 79th State Assembly district in 2020
Althea Stevens, incumbent Councilmember

Endorsements

District 17

Democratic primary

Declared
Gonzalo Duran, Marine Corps veteran
Rafael Salamanca, incumbent Councilmember

District 18

Democratic primary

Declared
Amanda Farias, incumbent Councilmember

Endorsements

Bronx/Queens crossover

District 22

Democratic primary

Declared
Tiffany Cabán, incumbent Councilmember
Charles Castro, former Chief of Staff for former Councilmember Hiram Monserrate, former NYPD officer, and candidate for New York's 13th State Senate district in 2002

Endorsements

Queens

District 19

Republican primary

Declared
Vickie Paladino, incumbent Councilmember

Democratic primary

Declared
Tony Avella, former New York State Senator from the 11th district (2011–2018), former New York City Councilmember from the 19th district (2002–2009), nominee for this seat in 2021
Christopher Bae, Assistant District Attorney for the Queens County District Attorney
Paul Graziano, Reform Party nominee for this seat in 2017

Withdrawn
Richard Lee, candidate for this seat in 2021

Endorsements

District 20

Democratic primary

Declared
Sandra Ung, incumbent Councilmember

Republican primary

Declared
Jin Liang Chen
Yu-Ching Pai, nominee for this seat in 2021

District 21

Democratic primary

Declared
Francisco Moya, incumbent Councilmember

District 23

Democratic primary

Declared
Steve Behar, staffer for former Councilmember Barry Grodenchik and candidate for this seat in 2021
Linda Lee, incumbent Councilmember
Rubaiya Rahman, Executive director of the Autism Society Habilitation Organization\

Republican primary

Declared
Bernard Chow, SHSAT activist

District 24

Democratic primary

Declared
James F. Gennaro, incumbent Councilmember
Rabby Syed, social worker

Republican primary

Declared
Jonathan Rinaldi

District 25

Democratic primary

Declared
Shekar Krishnan, incumbent Councilmember
Ricardo Pacheco, leader of the Jackson Heights Coop Alliance

Endorsements

Republican primary

Declared
Zhile Cao

District 26

Democratic primary

Declared
Lorenzo Brea, activist and candidate for this seat in 2021
Hailie Kim, adjunct professor at Hunter College and candidate for this seat in 2021
Julie Won, incumbent Councilmember

Endorsements

Republican primary

Declared
Marvin Jeffcoat, veteran and nominee for this seat in 2021

District 27

Democratic primary

Declared
Jabari Bell, managing partner at Walter & Wells Real Estate Group
Joanne Moreno, educator
Nantasha Williams, incumbent Councilmember

Republican primary

Declared
Marilyn Miller, nominee for New York's 32nd State Assembly district in 2022

District 28

Democratic primary

Declared
Adrienne Adams, incumbent Councilmember

Independents and third-parties

Declared
Rusat Ramgopal

District 29

Democratic primary

Declared
Ethan Felder, candidate for New York's 28th State Assembly district in 2022
Lynn Schulman, incumbent Councilmember
Sukhjinder Singh Nijjar, candidate for District Leader of New York's 24th State Assembly district in 2022

Republican primary

Declared
Danniel Maio, perennial candidate

District 30

Democratic primary

Declared
Robert Holden, incumbent Councilmember

District 31

Democratic primary

Declared
Selvena Brooks-Powers, incumbent Councilmember

Republican primary

Declared
Daniella May, plastic surgery nurse

District 32

Republican primary

Declared
Joann Ariola, incumbent Councilmember

Democratic primary

Declared
Michael Scala, attorney, candidate for this seat in 2021, nominee for this seat in 2017

Queens/Brooklyn crossover

District 34

Democratic primary

Declared
Jennifer Gutiérrez, incumbent Councilmember

Endorsements

Brooklyn

District 33

Democratic primary

Declared
Lincoln Restler, incumbent Councilmember

Endorsements

Republican primary

Declared
Martha Rowan, third-party candidate for New York's 26th State Senate district in 2022

District 35

Democratic primary

Declared
Crystal Hudson, incumbent Councilmember

Endorsements

Independents and third-parties

Declared
Kevin Paul

District 36

Democratic primary

Declared
Chi Ossé, incumbent Councilmember

Endorsements

District 37

Democratic primary

Declared
Hugo Espinal, former community liaison for former State Senator Martin Malave Dilan
Sandy Nurse, incumbent Councilmember

Endorsements

Republican primary

Declared
Mitchell Bosch, Anti-vax activist
Isaiah Vega, digital media editor

District 38

Democratic primary

Declared
Alexa Avilés, incumbent Councilmember

Endorsements

Republican primary

Declared
Paul Rodriguez, perennial candidate

Independents and third-parties

Declared
Erik Frankel, Democratic candidate for New York's 51st State Assembly district in 2022, Conservative Party nominee for this seat in 2021
Christopher Skelly (Libertarian), Secretary of the Brooklyn Libertarian Party

District 39

Democratic primary

Declared
Shahana Hanif, incumbent Councilmember
Nickie Kane, write-in candidate for Mayor of New York City in 2021

Endorsements

District 40

Democratic primary

Declared
Rita Joseph, incumbent Councilmember

Endorsements

District 41

Democratic primary

Potential
Reginald Bowman, Senior member of the Citywide Council of NYCHA Presidents
Darlene Mealy, incumbent Councilmember
Joyce Shearin, candidate for this seat in 2017

District 42

Democratic primary

Declared
Chris Banks, candidate for this seat in 2013
Charles Barron, incumbent Councilmember
Jamilah Almansoob-Rose, grant writer

Republican primary

Declared
Richard Simmons

District 43

Democratic primary

Declared
Wai Yee Chan, Executive Director of Homecrest Community Services
Stanley Ng, former member of the Community Education Council from the 20th district
Susan Zhuang, Chief of Staff to Assemblymember William Colton

Publicly expressed interest
Jimmy Li, podiatrist, former member of Brooklyn Community Board 7, former president of the New York City Asian-American Democratic Club, and candidate for New York's 10th congressional district in 2022

Endorsements

Republican primary

Declared
Chingkit Ho
Ying Tan

District 44

Democratic primary

Declared
Kalman Yeger, incumbent Councilmember

Republican primary

Declared
Heshy Tischler, Radio show host, community activist and candidate for the 48th district in 2021 and 2017

District 45

Democratic primary

Declared
Farah Louis, incumbent Councilmember

District 46

Democratic primary

Declared
Mercedes Narcisse, incumbent Councilmember

District 47

Republican primary

Declared
Anna Belfore-Delfaus, public school teacher
Ari Kagan, incumbent Councilmember (switched parties on December 5, 2022)
Avery Pereira, candidate for New York's 7th congressional district in 2020
Michael Ragusa, candidate for New York's 10th congressional district in 2022

Endorsements

Democratic primary

Declared
Justin Brannan, incumbent Councilmember from the 43rd district
Anthony Batista Perez, former staffer for former New York State Assemblymember Mathylde Frontus

District 48

Republican primary

Declared
Igor Kazatsker, recreational therapist
Inna Vernikov, incumbent Councilmember

Democratic primary

Declared
Amber Adler, candidate for this seat in 2021

Endorsements

Brooklyn/Staten Island crossover

District 50

Republican primary

Declared
David Carr, incumbent Councilmember

Staten Island

District 49

Democratic primary

Declared
Kamillah Hanks, incumbent Councilmember

Withdrawn
Amoy Barnes, candidate for this seat in 2021

Republican primary

Declared
Ruslan Shamal

District 51

Republican primary

Declared
Joe Borelli, incumbent Councilmember

Notes

References

New York City Council elections
New York City Council election
New York City Council election
Council election